K. Surendran (22 February 1921 – 9 August 1997) was an Indian novelist who wrote in Malayalam. He won the Kerala Sahitya Akademi Award in 1963 for the novel Maya and the Vayalar Award in 1994 for the novel Guru.

Biography
Surendran was born on 22 February 1921 in Ochira in Kollam district of Kerala state. He served in the Department of Post & Telegraph; and in 1965 he resigned his job to become a full-time writer. He authored many books in Malayalam, including ten novels, four plays, and several miscellaneous books. He won the Kerala Sahitya Akademi Award in 1963 for the novel Maya and the Vayalar Award in 1994 for the novel Guru. In 1997 he was conferred with the Sahitya Academy Fellowship. Surendran died on 9 August 1997.

Selected works

Novels

Maya
Thalam
Jwala
Kattukurangu
Shakthi
Bhikshamdehi
Maranam Durbalam
Kshanaprabhachanchalam
Aruna
Seetayanam
Pataka
Guru

Plays

Bali
Arakkillam
Palunku pathram
Anaswaramanushyan

Others

Manushyavastha
Kumaruvinte Balyam
NovelSwaroopam
Surendrante Prabandhangal
Kumaran Asan
Tolstoyiyude Kadha
Dostoyevskyiyude Kadha
Kalayum Samanyajanangalum
Jeevitavum  Njanum

References

1921 births
1997 deaths
People from Kollam district
Novelists from Kerala
Malayalam-language writers
Malayalam novelists
Recipients of the Kerala Sahitya Akademi Award
20th-century Indian novelists
Indian male novelists
20th-century Indian male writers